Aleksandr Romanovich Dovzhenko (1918–1995) was a Soviet and Ukrainian physician, psychiatrist, psychotherapist and substance abuse counselor. He is most famous for developing the Dovzhenko's method ("Coding").

Biography

Aleksandr Dovzhenko was born on March 29, 1918, in a family of a seaman.

In 1936 Dovzhenko has entered the Crimean Medical Institute and was graduated in 1941. 
After graduation Dovzhenko worked as a doctor in various places, where he began to implement modern psycho-therapeutic methods. In 1948 he was appointed as chief physician of a dermato-venerologic clinic in Feodosia. Afterwards for some time Dovzhenko worked in a medical office of the Feodosian Sea Port.

In 1977–1985 Dovzhenko worked as senior researcher in the V. P. Protopopov Research Institute of Clinical and Experimental Neurology and Psychiatry in Kharkiv. In the Kharkiv Institute for Doctors' Improvement Dovzhenko graduated from practical hypnosis courses.

The approbation of Dovzhenko's approach, its theoretical and scientific foundation was held in during 1979-1980s in the V. P. Protopopov Research Institute of Clinical and Experimental Neurology and Psychiatry in Kharkiv.

In 1984 Dovzhenko's method of therapy was recognized as an invention and registered by the State Committee on Inventions and Discoveries titled as "The Treatment of Сhronic Alcoholism based on Dovzhenko's method". Dovzhenko's method was approved by the Department for Implementing of Medication and Medical Equipment of the Ministry of Healthcare and by the Ministry of Healthcare of Soviet Ukraine.

Professor Irina Pyatnitskaya, who was a prominent scientist, clinician and a co-founder of modern Russian narcology, has highly assessed doctor Dovzhenko's method of therapy:

In 1985 in Feodosia's Stamboli Palace building Dovzhenko opened the Republican Narcological Psychotherapy Center under the Ministry of Healthcare of Soviet Ukraine.

Aleksandr Dovzhenko died in Feodosia on February 4, 1995, after a second stroke.

Rewards
 Distinguished Doctor of the Ukrainian SSR (Kiev, 1985)
 People's Doctor of the USSR (Moscow, May 23, 1989)
 Order of Friendship of Peoples
 Honorary citizen of Feodosia (1995)

Memory and recognition

 In Feodosia (1995) and later in Kharkiv (1996) three memorial plaques were installed in memory of Aleksandr Dovzhenko. One of the plaques was installed on a facade of the building of the Feodosia's Sea Port polyclinic where Dovzhenko worked for over 20 years. 
 In the 1980s and 1990s the number of pop-science films, created at Moscow and Kyiv film studios, exposed the works of the A. R. Dovzhenko Republican Narcological Psychotherapy Center (Республиканский Наркологический Психотерапевтический Центр им. А.Р. Довженко), located in Feodosia. On the premises of the center there is an educational and internship programs based on Dovzhenko's method aimed at psychotherapists specialized in narcology from almost all regions of post-USSR. 
 International scientific-practical conference named "Dovzheko's readings" arranged annually since 1999 in Kharkiv. The institutions that organize this event include National Academy of Medical Sciences of Ukraine, Institute of Neurology, Psychiatry and Narcology of the National Academy of Medical Sciences of Ukraine, Kharkiv Medical Academy of Post-graduate Education, the Ministry of Healthcare of Ukraine and the Ukrainian neurologist, psychiatrist and narcologist community. The collection of scientific works based on conference results are published. 
 Dovzhenko education charity was created in Moscow. 
 The Republican Narcological Psychotherapy Center under the Ministry of Healthcare of the Autonomous Republic of Crimea in Feodosia was named after of A. R. Dovzhenko. 
 Alexander Dovzhenko was buried at Novoe Kladbishche in Feodosia, where his marble bust was installed. A monument in his honor was constructed in the center of Feodosia. 
 Following the decision of Ukraine's and Russia's Ministries of Healthcare, a medal named after People's Doctor of the USSR A. R. Dovzhenko was established:

References

1918 births
1995 deaths
Ukrainian psychiatrists
Psychotherapists
Soviet psychiatrists
Soviet inventors